The governor of Batanes is the local chief executive and head of the Provincial Government of Batanes in the Philippines. Along with the governors of Cagayan, Isabela, Nueva Vizcaya, the province's chief executive is a member of the Regional Development Council of the Cagayan Valley Region.

List of governors of Batanes

References

Governors of Batanes
Governors of provinces of the Philippines